Guevea Zapotec, or Guevea de Humboldt Zapotec (Northern Isthmus Zapotec), is a Zapotecan language of the isthmus of Mexico.

References

Zapotec languages